Truscott is a hamlet in Cornwall, England, United Kingdom. It is in the parish of St Stephens by Launceston Rural and is about halfway between St Stephens and Egloskerry.

References

Hamlets in Cornwall